Alberto Peral (born 1966, Santurtzi, Biscay) is a Basque artist. He began to highlight in the principle of the 90s. Since his first individual exhibition at the Fundació Joan Miró in Barcelona in 1992, he has created a conceptual route that has brought him to move through a big diversity of mediums, like drawing, photography or sculpture.

Solo exhibits 
Selection
 2011 - Múltiples, Espacio Marzana, Bilbao
 2010 - Red, Arco 2010, Madrid
 2007 - Bailando, Museo Reina Sofia, Madrid
 2006 - Time, Galería Helga de Alvear, Madrid
 2005 - Estrechamientos, Sala Carlos III, University of Navarra, Pamplona
 2004 - El cuerpo sutil, Galeria Senda, Barcelona
 2003 - Cuatro Montañas, Galeria Helga de Alvear, Madrid
 2000 - Paisaje (amb Jesús Palomino), Espai cúbic, Fundació Pilar i Joan Miró, Palma
 1997 - Rotadores, Centre Cultural Tecla Sala (L'Hospitalet de Llobregat) and Sala Rekalde, Bilbao
 1992 - Superficie (with Ana Laura Alaez), Espai 13, Fundació Joan Miró

References 

Basque artists
1966 births
Living people